The 1974 Special Honours in New Zealand were two Special Honours List, published on 3 May and 4 October 1974, in which four judges and a former prime minister received knighthoods.

Knight Bachelor
 The Honourable Mr Justice Alec Leslie Haslam – senior puisne judge of the Supreme Court.
 The Honourable Mr Justice Ian Hannay Macarthur – puisne judge of the Supreme Court.
 The Honourable Mr Justice Arthur Owen Woodhouse  – judge of the Court of Appeal.

Order of the British Empire

Knight Grand Cross (GBE)
Civil division
 The Right Honourable John Ross Marshall  – lately Leader of the Opposition.

Knight Commander (KBE)
Civil division
 The Right Honourable Sir Thaddeus Pearcey McCarthy – president of the Court of Appeal.

References

Special honours
1974 awards